Peripatus heloisae is a species of velvet worm in the Peripatidae family. Females of this species have 31 to 34 pairs of legs; males have 28 to 32. The type locality is in Mato Grosso, Brazil.

References

Onychophorans of tropical America
Onychophoran species
Animals described in 1941